Events from the year 1927 in Michigan.

Office holders

State office holders
 Governor of Michigan: Fred W. Green (Republican)
 Lieutenant Governor of Michigan: George W. Welsh (Republican)/Luren Dickinson (Republican) 
 Michigan Attorney General: William W. Potter
 Michigan Secretary of State: Charles J. DeLand (Republican)/John S. Haggerty (Republican)
 Speaker of the Michigan House of Representatives: Lynn C. Gardner (Republican)
 Chief Justice, Michigan Supreme Court:

Mayors of major cities
 Mayor of Detroit: John W. Smith
 Mayor of Grand Rapids: 
 Mayor of Flint: Judson L. Transue
 Mayor of Lansing: Laird J. Troyer
 Mayor of Saginaw:

Federal office holders

 U.S. Senator from Michigan: James J. Couzens (Republican)
 U.S. Senator from Michigan: Woodbridge N. Ferris (Democrat)
 House District 1: John B. Sosnowski (Republican)/Robert H. Clancy (Republican)
 House District 2: Earl C. Michener (Republican)
 House District 3: Joseph L. Hooper (Republican)
 House District 4: John C. Ketcham (Republican)
 House District 5: Carl E. Mapes (Republican)
 House District 6: Grant M. Hudson (Republican)
 House District 7: Louis C. Cramton (Republican)
 House District 8: Bird J. Vincent (Republican)
 House District 9: James C. McLaughlin (Republican)
 House District 10: Roy O. Woodruff (Republican)
 House District 11: Frank D. Scott (Republican)/Frank P. Bohn (Republican)
 House District 12: W. Frank James (Republican)
 House District 13: Clarence J. McLeod (Republican)

Population

Sports

Baseball
 1927 Detroit Tigers season – Under manager George Moriarty, the Tigers compiled an 82–71 record and finished in fourth place in the American League. The team's statistical leaders included Harry Heilmann with a .398 batting average, 14 home runs and 120 RBIs, and Earl Whitehill with 16 wins and a 3.36 earned run average.

American football
 1927 Michigan State Normal Normalites football team – Under head coach Elton Rynearson, the Normalites compiled a perfect 8–0 record, won the Michigan Collegiate Conference championship, shut out six of eight opponents, and outscored all opponents by a total of 186 to 13.
 1927 Central Michigan Bearcats football team – Under head coach Wallace Parker, the Bearcats compiled a 7–1 record and outscored opponents by a total of 124 to 37.
 1927 Detroit Titans football team – Under head coach Gus Dorais, the Titans compiled a 7–2 record and outscored all opponents by a combined 235 to 47.
 1927 Michigan Wolverines football team – Under head coach Tad Wieman, the Wolverines compiled a 6–2 record and finished in third place in the Big Ten Conference. End Bennie Oosterbaan was a consensus All-American.
 1927 Michigan State Spartans football team – Under head coach Ralph H. Young, the Spartans compiled a 4–5 record.
 1927 Western State Hilltoppers football team – Under head coach Earl Martineau, the Hilltoppers compiled a 3–4 record and outscored their opponents, 100 to 72.

Basketball
 1926–27 Michigan Wolverines men's basketball team – Under head coach E. J. Mather, the Wolverines compiled a 14–3 record and won the Big Ten Conference championship.

Ice hockey
 1926–27 Detroit Cougars season – Under coaches Art Duncan and Duke Keats, the Cougars compiled a 12–28–4 record. Johnny Sheppard led the team with 13 goals, 8 assists, and 21 points. Hap Holmes was the team's goaltender.

Chronology of events

January

February

March

April

May

June

July

August

September

October

November

December

Births
 August 6 - William D. Ford, U.S. Congressman (1965-1993), in Detroit
 September 14 - Edmund Szoka, Archbishop of Detroit (1981–1990), in Grand Rapids

Deaths
 May 18 - 
 Andrew Kehoe, spree killer who initiated the Bath School disaster, suicide by explosives at age 55 in Bath Township
 The 44 victims of the Bath School disaster

See also
 History of Michigan
 History of Detroit

References